The Scottish Womens Premiership (officially called the Tennent's Women's Premiership for sponsorship reasons) is the top national competition for women's rugby union clubs in Scotland. The 2021-2022 season began on 12 September 2021. Ayr RFC decided to step down from the Premiership to National League Division 1, they were replaced by Heriot’s Blues Women.

History 
The Tennent’s Women’s League was restructured in 2018. A consultation process with clubs began in 2017 where clubs were invited to apply for the league that they felt best suited their women’s teams.

Teams
Heriot Blues Women
Watsonians
Corstorphine
Stirling County
Cartha Queens Park
Hillhead Jordanhill

Tournament History 
Watsonians won the trophy for the first time in 2019 after defeating Hillhead Jordanhill in the Tennent's Women's Premiership final.

References

External links
 Official site

Scot
Women
Women's rugby union in Scotland
Women's sports leagues in Scotland